Norman Cherkavsky, known as DJ Norman (December 23, 1982 – September 15, 2016) was a Ukrainian musician. His music was inspired by Kraftwerk. His last known song was "World War II". He won the "New Electro Award" as a starting musician.

Studio albums

Singles

References

1982 births
2016 deaths
Ukrainian musicians
Electronic instrument players